INIS-8 is an 8-bit character encoding developed by the International Nuclear Information System (INIS). It is an 8-bit extension of the 7-bit INIS character set (itself a subset of ASCII), adding a G1 set, and has MIB 52. It is also known as iso-ir-50 (after the ISO 2022 registration of its G1 set) and csISO50INIS8.

Character set

ISO-IR-51 
ISO-IR-51, "INIS Cyrillic Extension", is an alternative G1 set for 8-bit INIS, supporting KOI-8 encoded Russian alphabet letters, at the expense of the superscript and subscript digits.

See also 
INIS character set

Footnotes

References 

Character sets
International Atomic Energy Agency